The 1973 California Golden Bears football team was an American football team that represented the University of California, Berkeley in the Pacific-8 Conference (Pac-8) during the 1973 NCAA Division I football season. In their second year under head coach Mike White, the Golden Bears compiled a 4–7 record (2–5 against Pac-8 opponents), finished in a tie for fifth place in the Pac-8, and were outscored by their opponents by a combined total of 380 to 245.

The team's statistical leaders included Vince Ferragamo with 1,014 passing yards (Steve Bartkowski added 910 passing yards), Chuck Muncie with 801 rushing yards, and Wesley Walker with 361 receiving yards.

Schedule

Game summaries

Washington

Cal gained 625 yards of total offense, the second best in school history. Steve Bartkowski came off the bench when Vince Ferragamo was shaken up with the Golden Bears ahead 21–7.

Oregon State

Roster

References

California
California Golden Bears football seasons
California Golden Bears football